Mexoryl is the trade name of a number of UV absorbers. The most commonly used are:
Drometrizole trisiloxane (Mexoryl XL)
Ecamsule (Mexoryl SX, terephthalylidene dicamphor sulfonic acid)